Kris Tyler (born in Omaha, Nebraska) is an American country music artist. Tyler has released one studio album; she also charted two singles on the Billboard Hot Country Singles & Tracks chart. Her highest charting single, "What a Woman Knows," peaked at No. 45 in 1997.

Discography

Albums

Singles

Music videos

References

External links
[ allmusic ((( Kris Tyler > Overview )))]

American women country singers
American country singer-songwriters
Living people
Rising Tide Records artists
Musicians from Omaha, Nebraska
Country musicians from Nebraska
Year of birth missing (living people)
21st-century American women
Singer-songwriters from Nebraska